Swamp currant is a common name for several flowering plants and may refer to:

Ribes humile, native to China
Ribes lacustre, native to North America
Ribes triste, native to North America